Agurain in Basque and Salvatierra in Spanish (officially Agurain/Salvatierra), it is a town and municipality located in the province of Álava in the Basque Autonomous Community, northern Spain. The municipality, numbering 4,986 inhabitants (2015), is in turn the head town of the district or Cuadrilla of Salvatierra. The gross income per family amounts to 6,784 € (1997, Basque Autonomous Community: 8,258 €). With reference to workforce by economic sectors, 10.36% are employed in agriculture, 35.78% in the industry sector, 47.92% in the service sector and 5.95% in the construction industry (data not available for the municipality, applies to the larger Salvatierra District).

The council is headed by Mr Iñaki Beraza, member of the Basque Nationalist Party (EAJ-PNV)

Geography
The municipality, located at the centre of the eastern Alavese Plains, comprises a core built-up area sitting on a low ridge (605 m high) and consisting of three historical streets that stretch out south to north, i.e. Zapatari, Mayor and Carnicería, which bear witness to ancient guild clusters. North and west at the feet of the ridge, two watercourses, the Santa Barbara and Zadorra, outlined the town's limits not time ago, while increasingly absorbed by the rapid urban development. Outside the walls of the town spread age old neighbourhoods, such as the Madura (Basque for 'swamp'), La Magdalena or San Jorge. On either side of the road connecting the 'Portal del Rey' (main south entrance to the town) and the train station, a sprawl developed in the 1950s and 1960s, called La Moncloa. The town keeps on growing east beside the Madura through new housing projects in the 2000s (decade), i.e. Harresi Parkea.

There are other minor nuclei (villages) dotting the outward lands of the municipality of Salvatierra as follows: 
 Alangua
 Arrizala: home to the famous dolmen Sorginetxe.
 Egileor
 Iturrieta: former village on a plateau, nowadays the site of an experimental farm. Not part of the municipality, but sometimes included within it for statistical purposes.
 Opakua: at the foot of the mount Arrigorrista, lends its name to a winding mountain pass.

Economy
Agurain benefits from its location on the important European road axis N-1 E-5 E-80 and the Northern Railway, following that it developed industry since the early 20th century. In this respect, it is worth mentioning the one time stinky Curtidos Salvatierra S.A.L., a tanning factory, which provided not long ago work for so many inhabitants. Nowadays the town numbers three industrial estates, the two existing so far and a new one under construction, namely, Litutxipi across the train station, Agurain on the west (with PEM, former PUM Española, as its traditional flagship factory; maximum surface area for building 19,773 m2) and Galzar (urbanization  works under way in 2008, maximum surface area for building 14,035 m2). The two latter industrial estates participate in a wider regional logistic scheme known as Vitoria Logistic Corridor.

A solar power plant in the outskirts of the town was inaugurated in 2007, currently the biggest in the Basque Autonomous Community, with a view to injecting into the power network 350,000 kWh/year.

History

The town of Salvatierra was founded in 1256 by the Castilian king Alfonso X on the former settlement of the village Hagurahin on top of a hill, a highly defensible position. Castile was intent on strengthening the territories bordering on the Kingdom of Navarre seized some decades ago. As a result, the king founded various strongholds or free towns (salvas terras, seguras and villas francas) over the lands of Gipuzkoa and Álava en route to Gascony through the northern Way of St. James, with a view at the same time to fostering Castilian trade.

Salvatierra was in the ensuing decades and centuries home to various scuffles, battles and sieges on the grounds of its bordering location with Navarre and its strategic position in the King's Highway to France. In the 13th century, the definitive layout of the town was established, with encircling walls and two big fortified churches sealing Salvatierra at the north and south ends (Santa María and San Juan churches respectively). The so-called olbeas were erected at this time too. These consisted of arcades, made originally of wood, next to both parishes in the one-time bustling marketplaces, and they have endured up to the present, although reconstructed in the 16th century.

The town thrived on its good location and trade in the Way of St. James, and it even had a Jewish quarter, located in today's 'Arramel' st. In 1521 the town had to fend off the attack of its own lord, the Count of Salvatierra, a rebellious leader that revolted against emperor Charles V in the Revolt of the Comuneros. Yet he failed to win the town, the Count was arrested and executed  by the imperial forces, much to the joy of the inhabitants. The joy didn't last long though, since shortly afterwards the plague swept through the town, which eventually resulted in the burning of Salvatierra (1564), a disaster that some blame on a desperate attempt to put an end to the grim epidemic. Only the walls (and both main churches) were spared, almost the whole town was destroyed, a fact reflected in poems by the writer Juan Perez de Lazarraga.

Salbatierra
egun ey dago tristeric
oyta dabela
eguiten asco negarric
çerren jarri da
guztia destruiduric
ez da gueratu
barruan ese galantic
çerca çabaloc
jarri ey dira bacarric
oy onezquero
ez da mercatu bearric (...)

After the burning, a vigorous and elegant reconstruction ensued under the hallmark of the Renaissance (late XVI-early XVII). Worth highlighting are the sumptuous walled stately homes in between the main streets, such as the Casa de los Diezmos in the 'Carnicería' st. While the building frenzy of the previous century waned in the 18th century, there were still some outstanding works like the pentagonal San Juan Church's baroque style porch stretching out to the centre of the marketplace.

The 19th century was to know unrest and turmoil in this area. The First Carlist War left a mayor scar on the town's medieval nucleus, since the walls were demolished in order to furnish the nearby Guevara fortress, a Carlist key position, with proper material. Between both Carlist Wars the railway was established up to the French border; however, the stretch between Vitoria-Gasteiz and Olazagutia was ready by 1862, so Agurain had already a railway stop at that time, following that the town started to expand south out of the medieval nucleus by lining both sides of the road to the station and SW of the Main Road N-1.

Crossroads

The location of Salvatierra in the middle of a plain has been an important crossroads as early as the Neolithic age, as evidenced by the presence of two important dolmens nearby (see below). Scholars pinpoint the Roman manor Alba, a milestone in the Astorga-Bordeaux Roman road (extending west to east), in the nearby village of Albeniz (some others point to Salvatierra). The way winding down the pass (cave) of San Adrian into the plains around Agurain that was to become the Way of St. James evidences prehistoric traces of seasonal cattle migration, dolmens and burial mounds in the area. It was also used by Romans and gained momentum after the seizure of Gipuzkoa and Alava by the Castilians.

The use of the Way of St. James lost ground to new and more convenient roads, like the one built through Salinas de Leniz in 1765, which proved more practical for carriages, resulting in the transfer of the traffic to the latter. The traffic gone trickle first and drain later brought about some decay to Salvatierra. Yet new communications were being built at the time: Vitoria-Gasteiz was connected to the town with a new road in 1820, and on to the corridor of Burunda. In 1862 the railway connecting Madrid and Irun arrived in the town. After having crossed the town right in the south entrance to the Medieval Nucleus for decades, currently the main road E-5 A-1 (Nacional I) passes by the town west to east en route to France.

Language
The main language of use in Salvatierra is currently Spanish and it has been so for at least the last 150 years. In 1841, there was an interpreter required by the town council for Basque speaking residents. The geographer Elisée Reclus includes the town within the boundaries of the Basque language area still in 1867. Nowadays younger generations that come out of Basque-language schools (called ikastolas) since the 1970s may speak and/or understand Basque.

Features

 San Juan and Santa María churches: Both impressive churches tower over the town. Due to the fortified nature of Agurain, both churches seal off the town south and north in a continuum with the town walls. Hence military architecture may be noticed (thick and stark walls, few windows and outward corridors perched on their walls for the sentries). Their current construction dates from the period spanning the 14th to early 16th century. They are both made in late gothic style and distributed in three naves.
 Dolmen Sorginetxe: This dolmen north of Arrizala is not far from another one, Aizkomendi (located north-east in the village of Eguilaz), which bears witness to dolmen building activity in the Neolithic. These dolmens, used as burial monuments, were arguably situated at crossroads. The area is not without tales of witches and spells (in step with the dolmen's name: 'witch house'), especially as regards the cavern of Lezao.
 Olbeas of San Juan: The present-day arcade sloping up south to north goes back to the 16th century (rebuilt after the fire). The long corridor glows with picturesque charm, with some of its columns being made of wood. A marketplace is held there every Tuesday since the town charter was granted in 1256.

References

External links
 SALVATIERRA/AGURAIN in the Bernardo Estornés Lasa - Auñamendi Encyclopedia (Euskomedia Fundazioa) Site in Spanish
 Tourist information about SALVATIERRA/AGURAIN by the regional Basque Government
 Tourist information about the Salvatierra Municipality and District
 Alternative point of view on town issues Site in Spanish
 History and tourist information about Salvatierra/agurain Site in Spanish

Municipalities in Álava
1256 establishments in Europe
13th-century establishments in Castile